Nakhodka Fertilizer Plant (translit. Nahodkinsky Zavod Mineralnih udobrenii abbreviated as NZMU) is an investment project for the construction of a plant for the production of methanol and nitrogen fertilizers in Primorsky region. In 2016, Artem Alekseevich Obolensky became 100% shareholder of the plant.

Stages of project implementation 
 January 2013 - Feasibility study. Toyo Engineering Corporation completed its work on preparing a feasibility study for NZMU construction.
 September 2015 - Contract with Gazprom Mezhregiongas Group on the supply of natural gas in the amount of 3.15 billion cubic meters per year.
 September 2016 - EPC-contract concluded.
 2017 - Project documentation under the EPC-contract, basic project design.
 2017 - 2018 - Purchase of equipment and placement of orders.
 October 2018 - February 2022 - Construction and installation of equipment (completion of work under the EPC-contract.)
 July 2016 - February 2022 - Completion of construction and commissioning works.
 April 2022 - Commercial production. Reaching full capacity.

External links 
 http://nzmu.ru/
 http://www.globalconstructionreview.com/news/korean-japanese-consort7ium-bui7ld-5bn-fertiliz7er/
 http://www.ajudaily.com/view/20160905084508451
 http://www.worldconstructionnetwork.com/news/hyundai-consortium-wins-5bn-russia-construction-deal
 http://www.khl.com/magazines/international-construction/detail/item120712/Hyundais-US$5-billion-deal-for-Russian-factory
 http://www.koreatimes.co.kr/www/news/biz/2016/09/123_213503.html
 http://english.yonhapnews.co.kr/news/2016/09/04/82/0200000000AEN20160904001400315F.html 

Manufacturing companies of Russia
Engineering companies of Russia
Nuclear technology companies of Russia
Companies based in Primorsky Krai